Vietnamese civil war may refer to:
Anarchy of the 12 Warlords (944–968)
Lê–Mạc Dynasties War (1533–1677)
Trịnh–Nguyễn Lords War (1627–1772; 1774–1775)
Tây Sơn–Nguyễn Lords War (1771–1785; 1800–1802)
Tây Sơn–Trịnh Lords War (1786–1789)
Vietnamese Civil War of 1789-1802
Vietnam War (1955-75)

 Wars involving Vietnam
 Civil wars involving the states and peoples of Asia